Finsthwaite is a small village in the South Lakeland district, in the county of Cumbria, England. It is located near the Furness Fells and Windermere. Finsthwaite has a place of worship, St Peter's Church, and a Bobbin Mill called Stott Park Bobbin Mill, now a working museum.

Finsthwaite is in the civil parish of Colton.

History 
A picture of Finsthwaite in the eighteenth century is found in the account book of one of its residents.

See also

Listed buildings in Colton, Cumbria

References

External links
 Cumbria County History Trust: Colton (nb: provisional research only – see Talk page)
 http://www.english-lakes.com/finsthwaite.html

Villages in Cumbria
Colton, Cumbria